Giovanni Gallo (born 6 February 1955, in Loreggia) is an Italian politician from Veneto.

A long-time member of the Italian Communist Party, the Democratic Party of the Left and the Democrats of the Left, Gallo was elected to the Regional Council of Veneto in 2000 and 2005. Between 2005 and 2010 he was also floor leader of the Democrats of the Left and, later, of the Democratic Party.

References

1955 births
Living people
People from the Province of Padua
Italian Communist Party politicians
20th-century Italian politicians
Democratic Party of the Left politicians
Democrats of the Left politicians
Members of the Regional Council of Veneto